Kilmuir (Scottish Gaelic: Cille Mhoire) is a village on the west coast of the Trotternish peninsula in the north of the island of Skye. It is in the Scottish council area of Highland and is the only place in Scotland (apart from the Western Isles) where Scottish Gaelic is spoken by about half of the population.  Flora MacDonald, who assisted Bonnie Prince Charlie to escape from Scotland after his defeat at Culloden, and fashion designer Alexander McQueen are buried in the cemetery here.

History
Within the parish lies Blàr a' Bhuailte, the "field of the stricken", where Vikings are said to have made their last stand in Skye near Loch Leum na Luirginn.

Notes and references

Populated places in the Isle of Skye